Thomae's function is a real-valued function of a real variable that can be defined as:

It is named after Carl Johannes Thomae, but has many other names: the popcorn function, the raindrop function, the countable cloud function, the modified Dirichlet function, the ruler function, the Riemann function, or the Stars over Babylon (John Horton Conway's name). Thomae mentioned it as an example for an integrable function with infinitely many discontinuities in an early textbook on Riemann's notion of integration.

Note that  is the only number in  that is coprime to 

It is a modification of the Dirichlet function, which is 1 at rational numbers and 0 elsewhere.

Properties

Related probability distributions
Empirical probability distributions related to Thomae's function appear in DNA sequencing. The human genome is diploid, having two strands per chromosome. When sequenced, small pieces ("reads") are generated: for each spot on the genome, an integer number of reads overlap with it. Their ratio is a rational number, and typically distributed similarly to Thomae's function.

If pairs of positive integers  are sampled from a distribution  and used to generate ratios , this gives rise to a distribution  on the rational numbers. If the integers are independent the distribution can be viewed as a convolution over the rational numbers, . Closed form solutions exist for power-law distributions with a cut-off. If  (where  is the polylogarithm function) then . In the case of uniform distributions on the set  , which is very similar to Thomae's function.

The ruler function

For integers, the exponent of the highest power of 2 dividing  gives 0, 1, 0, 2, 0, 1, 0, 3, 0, 1, 0, 2, 0, 1, 0, ... . If 1 is added, or if the 0s are removed, 1, 2, 1, 3, 1, 2, 1, 4, 1, 2, 1, 3, 1, 2, 1, ... . The values resemble tick-marks on a 1/16th graduated ruler, hence the name. These values correspond to the restriction of the Thomae function to the dyadic rationals: those rational numbers whose denominators are powers of 2.

Related functions

A natural follow-up question one might ask is if there is a function which is continuous on the rational numbers and discontinuous on the irrational numbers. This turns out to be impossible. The set of discontinuities of any function must be an  set. If such a function existed, then the irrationals would be an   set. Therefore, each of the  would be nowhere dense, and the irrationals would be a meager set. It would follow that the real numbers, being the union of the irrationals and the rationals (which, as a countable set, is evidently meager), would also be a meager set. This would contradict the Baire category theorem: because the reals form a complete metric space, they form a Baire space, which cannot be meager in itself.

A variant of Thomae's function can be used to show that any  subset of the real numbers can be the set of discontinuities of a function. If  is a countable union of closed sets , define

Then a similar argument as for Thomae's function shows that  has A as its set of discontinuities.

See also
 Blumberg theorem
 Cantor function
 Dirichlet function
 Euclid's orchard – Thomae's function can be interpreted as a perspective drawing of Euclid's orchard
 Volterra's function

References

 (Example 5.1.6 (h))

External links
 
 

Calculus
General topology
Special functions